John Theodore McAuliffe (May 21, 1901 – December 17, 1971) was an American football halfback for the Green Bay Packers of the National Football League (NFL). He played college football for Montana and Beloit.

Biography
McAuliffe was born on May 21, 1901, in Butte, Montana.

Career
McAuliffe played with the Green Bay Packers during the 1926 NFL season. He played at the collegiate level at Beloit College and the University of Montana.

See also
List of Green Bay Packers players

References

1901 births
1971 deaths
Sportspeople from Butte, Montana
Green Bay Packers players
American football halfbacks
Beloit College alumni
University of Montana alumni
Beloit Buccaneers football players
Montana Grizzlies football players
Players of American football from Montana